Blessing Liman (born 13 March 1984), is a Nigerian military personnel of the Nigerian Air Force best known for being Nigeria's first female military pilot.

Life
Blessing Liman was born on 13 March, 1984 in Zangon Kataf, Kaduna State, Northern Nigeria. Liman is a descent of Zangon Kataf Local Government Area of Kaduna State, Nigeria. Blessing Liman was an alumnus of the Nigerian College of Aviation Technology, she enlisted into the Nigerian Air Force in July 2011 and was commissioned on 9 December 2011. On 27 April 2012, she made history by becoming Nigeria's first female combat pilot following the badge decoration ceremony of thirty flying officers by Chief of Air Staff, Air Marshal Mohammed Dikko Umar.

References

1984 births
Living people
People from Kaduna State
Nigerian women aviators
Nigerian aviators
Women air force personnel
African women in war
Women in 21st-century warfare
Nigerian female military personnel
History of women in Nigeria
Nigerian Air Force personnel